Kaliski Klub Sportowy 1925 Kalisz, often shortened to just KKS Kalisz, historically in the past named KKS Włókniarz 1925 Kalisz and Włókniarz Kalisz, is a Polish football club based in Kalisz, Poland. The men's senior team is currently playing in the II liga, however the club also possesses women's football and swimming sections.

History 
The club has had a long but turbulent history, majority of it spent in amateur or semi-professional divisions. the original club was founded in 1925 as Kaliski Klub Sportwowy Kalisz.

In December 1948, a merger of 7 local clubs from the local textile industry created a new club, which was eventually renamed in February 1950 as Włókienniczy Związkowy Klub Sportowy Włókniarz Kalisz.

However, a dire financial situation caused the club to be liquidated on the 6 March 1992, and many sections of the club ceased to exist. The football section of the club was reformed under the name Wistil in 1991, shortly before its official disbandment, and quickly returned to the name KKS Kalisz after disbandment of the original club.

With lack of on-field successes and failure to climb the league pyramid, the club withdrew half through the Fourth Division in the 2002–2003 season, officially disbanding in March 2003. The club reformed under the name KKS Prosna Kalisz but failed to field a senior team. The fans and management of the club decided to re-establish the club from scratch in 2006, starting from the bottom of the football pyramid, the 8th division, and earned promotion in their first season. In that decision, they also decided to establish a women's football team.

Past seasons

Supporters and rivalries 
The club has a relatively large fan-base considering its lack of on-field achievements and lowly league position throughout its history. The ultras number from 150–1000 for matches depending on the rival. The fans have however place a strong emphasis of the hooligan element of support.

The fan movement started in the 90's as a local Widzew Łódź fan-club. They established friendly relations with Ceramika Opoczno in 1995, which lasted until 2000. Also in 1995 the fans established friendly relations with Chrobry Głogów. However, during a match between Chrobry Głogów and Górnik Wałbrzych, huge fight erupted between Widzew and KKS fans, which resulted in KKS no longer being a Widzew fan-club. The friendship with Chrobry lasted until 2007. In the past there were friendly contacts with Pogoń Zduńska Wola and Warta Sieradz fans. Currently the fans have friendly contacts with Widzew Łódź (now as a separate entity not a fan-club), Elana Toruń, and Italian fans of Como.

The club has two large rivals: Górnik Konin and Ostrovia Ostrów Wielkopolski. Both rivals sympathise with regional powerhouse Lech Poznań, KKS being one of the very few lower league teams in Greater Poland not to do so. Fans frequently shout Autonomia Kaliska! ("Kaliszan Autonomy!"), referring for autonomy from the Greater Poland region. In turn, their rivals respond with Wielkopolska bez Kalisza! ("Greater Poland without Kalisz!"). As a result of this KKS have rivalries with many other teams in the region who also sympathise with Lech, such as Kania Gostyń, Astra Krotoszyn, Jarota Jarocin, Pogoń Nowe Skalmierzyce, Polonia Kępno and Victoria Września. With regards to Lech itself, due to large discrepancy in divisions it has extended to only the reserve team and an off-field rivalry with the local Lech fan-club. They also have a strong rivalry with the other Poznań club Warta Poznań.

Current squad

Out on loan

Famous players 
Players who have played in the Ekstraklasa
  Marcin Kaczmarek

See also 
 Kalisz
 Football in Poland
 List of football clubs in Poland

References

External links 
  

Association football clubs established in 1925
Multi-sport clubs in Poland
1925 establishments in Poland
Kalisz
Football clubs in Greater Poland Voivodeship